Dinosaur Ridge is a segment of the Dakota Hogback in the Morrison Fossil Area National Natural Landmark located in Jefferson County, Colorado, near the town of Morrison and just west of Denver.

The Dinosaur Ridge area is one of the world's most famous dinosaur fossil localities. In 1877, fossil excavation began at Dinosaur Ridge under the direction of paleontologist Othniel Charles Marsh.  Some of the best-known dinosaurs were found here, including Stegosaurus, Apatosaurus, Diplodocus, and Allosaurus. In 1973, the area was recognized for its uniqueness as well as its historical and scientific significance when it was designated the Morrison Fossil Area National Natural Landmark by the National Park Service.  In 1989, the Friends of Dinosaur Ridge formed to address increasing concerns regarding the preservation of the site and to offer educational programs on the area's resources.

The rocks on the west side of Dinosaur Ridge are part of the widespread Morrison Formation of Jurassic age. It is in these rocks, where Arthur Lakes discovered the dinosaur bones in 1877. Fifteen quarries were opened along the Dakota hogback in the Morrison area in search of these fossils.

The rocks on the east side of Dinosaur Ridge are part of the Cretaceous Dakota Formation.  When Alameda Parkway was being constructed in 1937 to provide access to Red Rocks Park, workers discovered hundreds of dinosaur footprints.  These were found to include mostly Iguanodon-like footprints, perhaps from Eolambia. Carnivorous theropod tracks are also present.

The site features the Dinosaur Ridge Exhibit Hall with displays about the dinosaurs found at the site. Additionally, Dinosaur Ridge has interpretive signs at trail locations that explain the local geology, a volcanic ash bed, trace fossils, paleo-ecology, economic development of coal, oil and clay, and many other geologic and paleontological features.

In June 2011, Dinosaur Ridge was combined with another track site, the Parfet Prehistoric Preserve, about three miles north. The combined National Natural Landmark is now the Morrisson-Golden Fossil Areas.

Dinosaur Ridge Walk

The exhibits are located along a closed section of West Alameda Ave. The walk is about  round-trip taking 2-hours. A shuttle bus tour is available for an additional cost.

Museum (elevation )
 Walk Through Time Trail
 Rooney Ranch
Western Interior Seaway
Mangrove Swamp – Slimy Beach – A mat of microorganisms formed on a tidal flat that was flooded during extremely high tides.  At some point, the area was rapidly buried starting a process of fossilization.  The gray surfaces were fully developed mats.  Depressed areas have been degraded by an outside force, such as a dinosaur's footprint.  Additional degradation from water currents are shown by the ripple marks.

Dinosaur Tracks A trace is two or more dinosaur trails.  From these, it is possible to identify lifestyles of the creatures. These Ornithopods, i.e., Iguanodon, were herbivores that walked on their two hind legs as well as at time using all four legs for movement.  They lacked claws on their feet.  The presence of  tracks adjacent to  prints is taken as evidence of parenting behaviors.
Geologic Puzzle
Trace Fossils The exposure of Dakota Sandstone reveals numerous 'trace fossils'.  These are fossils that appear as irregularities of the rock.  They are actually the remnants of animal burrows and marine plants.

Ecology The hogback is a transitional zone between the Rocky Mountains and the High Plains.  Plants and animals from both areas can be found.  Among the plants are Mountain mahogany, junipers, sumacs, Gambel's oak and a few Ponderosa pines.  The dominate mammals are the mule deer, rock squirrel, and foxes.  Scrub jays and magpies are the representative birds.  During spring migration, over 2,000 raptors pass northwards along the ridge.
Ripple Marks – Ripple marks form on the sandy bottoms of water feature because of wave motion or currents.  The direction of the water is perpendicular or across the ridges.
Hogback (elevation ) – The ridge is part of the Dakota Hogback, paralleling the front range of the Rocky Mountains.  The term hogback is a reference to a similarity to the back of an Arkansas razorback hog.  A harder layer of resistant rock forms the ‘backbone’ or ‘hogback’.  Here, it is Dakota sandstone.  Softer layers above erode, leaving the backbone rising above the surrounding landscape.  Softer layers below the Dakota sandstone, form an escarpment in the older layers below.
Denver Basin
Oil and Gas
Cretaceous Time ((elevation )  - During the Cretaceous Period this was the shore of the Western Interior Seaway.  The build-up of soils from the coastal plains created the Dakota Group, which is topped by a tan sandstone of the ridge.
Geologic Puzzle A large ball shaped concretion was found in this layer of rock.  It formed around a central nucleus. There is no additional evidence to explain its creation.
Volcanic Ash Bed – Bedded between a layer of sandstone and shale is a white layer of volcanic ash.  USGS dated the layer to 105.6 million years ago (Mya), while in 2009, Massachusetts Institute of Technology dated it to 104.5 Mya matching the Cretaceous Period of the fossil record. The ash came from volcanic fields far to the west.
Faults
Geologic Overview
Dinosaur Bulges  – The bulges are the underside of a foot print. Walking across soft sand, the soil became depressed and then new sand filled into the depression forming a new layer, which has become the fossil. The size is in the range of a large sauropod. The smaller prints fit with a young Stegosaurus.
Jurassic Time – Scattered through this layer, are dark brown fossils. The fossils are smooth of texture and rusty brown in color.  They include small vertebrae and long leg bones.  Among the fossils identified were Stegosaurus and a sauropod.
Dinosaur Bone Quarry – The Discovery.
Bone Deposition (elevation ) - Bone deposits formed along the inside of a bend of a fast-moving stream.  Forming a ‘point bar’ as the fast-moving water deposited sand and the larger bones of decaying animals.  Over time, a series of bars developed with a variety of bones encased in the sand to become fossils.
Theropod Track - Removed from its original location in 1937 during road construction. The track is from a theropod, of which the Allosaurus is the specific fossil found in these layers. Also found in the fossil record here are the Torvosaurus or Ceratosaurus.

West Gate (elevation ) The west end of the trail has a barricade across the roadway and vehicles are allowed to park along the spur from Morrison Road that has become a cul-de-sac.

References

External links

 Friends of Dinosaur Ridge
 Photos 
 Dinosaur Ridge Information

Museums in Jefferson County, Colorado
National Natural Landmarks in Colorado
Natural history museums in Colorado
Dinosaur museums in the United States
Fossil trackways in the United States
Ridges of Colorado
Jurassic paleontological sites of North America
Cretaceous paleontological sites of North America
Protected areas of Jefferson County, Colorado
Fossil parks in the United States
Landforms of Jefferson County, Colorado
Paleontology in Colorado